The Laurel Pop Festival was a music festival held at the Laurel Race Course in Laurel, Maryland on July 11–12, 1969.

Background
The festival featured Buddy Guy, Al Kooper, Jethro Tull, Johnny Winter, Edwin Hawkins and Led Zeppelin (on July 11); and Jeff Beck, Ten Years After, Sly and the Family Stone, The Mothers of Invention, Savoy Brown and The Guess Who (on July 12).

Despite its line-up of top flight acts, the festival remains unheralded and somewhat forgotten. It took place one month before Woodstock.

See also 
List of music festivals in the United States
List of historic rock festivals
Led Zeppelin Played Here

References

Pop music festivals in the United States
Concerts in the United States
Laurel, Maryland
Hippie movement
1969 in American music
Rock festivals in the United States
Music festivals established in 1969
1969 music festivals